The United States Air Force has several types of weather squadrons.

Weather Squadrons

Operational Weather Squadrons

Weather Reconnaissance Squadrons

Miscellaneous Weather Squadrons

See also
 List of United States Air Force squadrons

References

Weather